The Bundesstraße 4 (abbr. B4) is a German federal highway running in a northwesterly to southly direction from the state of Schleswig-Holstein to Bavaria. It provides a direct route for motorists traveling between Hamburg and Nuremberg.

The section north of Hamburg is paralleled by Bundesautobahn 7 and the road is down-graded to a Landstraße (country road); the section between Hallstadt and Erlangen  is paralleled by the A 70 and A 73 and is also down-graded to a Staatsstraße (state road, same as country road).

The Bundesstraße 4 is the former Reichsstraße 4 (imperial road), on which north of Quickborn the last Commanding Admiral of the Kriegsmarine Friedeburg met with officers of the 2nd British Army to negotiate a truce with the Western Allied forces on May 4, 1945.

See also
Transport in Hamburg

004
B004
B004
B004
B004
B004